Rathmolyon is a village in the southern portion of County Meath, Ireland, situated 8 km south of Trim. It is situated at the junction of the R156 regional road and the R159 regional road connecting Trim to Enfield. Rathmolyon serves as a service centre for the surrounding rural area.

Public transport
Bus Éireann route 115A provides a commuter link from Rathmolyon to Dublin via Summerhill and Dunboyne with one journey in the morning and an evening journey back every day except Sunday.

Local history 
The village developed at the junction of two regional roads. A number of buildings in the village date from the Georgian and Victorian periods. During the late 19th century, the area played a role in the development of the Two by Twos and Cooneyite movement, the only religion known to have had its origin in Ireland.

Notable or historic buildings in Rathmolyon include a Catholic church, a Protestant church, two public houses, Cherryvalley House, Rathmoylon Villa and Rathmoylon House.

Development 
The population of Rathmolyon almost doubled in the ten years between the 2006 census (168 inhabitants) and the 2016 census (334 people). According to the 2016 census report, almost 50% of the town's houses (53 of 108 households) were constructed between 2001 and 2010.

The "Rathmolyon Esker" east of Rathmolyon has been proposed as a Natural Heritage Area.

See also
 List of towns and villages in Ireland

References

Towns and villages in County Meath